Roseto Valfortore is a small town and comune of the Province of Foggia, in the Apulia Region of southeastern Italy.

Located in the Daunian Mountains near Fortore springs, Roseto Valfortore is awarded "I Borghi più belli d'Italia" quality mark.

Geography
The landscape surrounding Roseto Valfortore is rolling hills and low mountains, with the river Fortore flowing below the town. It gives the valley its name, Valfortore ("Valley of the Fortore"). The hills surrounding Roseto have electric power windmills.

Roseto Valfortore is a   traditional Italian hill town, with predominantly stone and masonry buildings in the older sections.  Historic stone churches include the Cappella della Consolazione, Santa Maria Assunta, and San Nicola.

Emigration
There have been numerous waves of emigration from the town of Roseto Valfortore since the late 19th century.  The first immigrants to the United States from there arrived in the Lehigh Valley of Pennsylvania in 1883, to work in the local slate quarries. They settled in Bangor first, then bought land in the area, and established the settlement of Roseto, an Italian cultural enclave named after their home village. In 1894 alone, 1,200 residents of Roseto Valfortore applied for passports to the U.S.

In the 1920s, 1930s, 1940s and 1950s it was recorded that many migrated to Youngstown, Ohio and surrounding areas. Many migrants worked in the steel mills in Ohio. Throughout the 1950s and 1960s more than 3,000 Rosetani migrated to Toronto and its surrounding areas, as well as to Washington D.C.

References

External links

Official website

Cities and towns in Apulia